Gaddi's is a French haute cuisine restaurant situated in The Peninsula Hong Kong hotel.  It was opened in 1953 and named after a former general manager of The Peninsula, Leo Gaddi.  The current chef de cuisine is Albin Gobil.

Decor 
The decor is meant to evoke old Hong Kong and the hotel's original 1928 neoclassical architecture.  It has a European dining room, with two six-foot crystal-and-silver chandeliers from Paris, Tai Ping carpets, and a Chinese coromandel screen dating from 1670.

It also created the first chef's table in Hong Kong where the Chef Table diners sit at a special table beside the Gaddi's kitchen viewing the dishes being prepared.

Food 
The food is classically French but with inventive European influences.Online Frommer's review

Examples of past dishes include: 
 Raw-marinated foie gras with toasted brioche
 Twice-cooked pork belly with mustard risotto
 Bitter herb salad and balsamico sauce
 Specially selected American Black Angus Sirloin baked in a rosemary and salt crust with pea puree
 Roquefort fritters and pan-fried rye bread with melted Camembert and oscietra caviar

There is a ten course tasting menu which lets the diners taste a sample of many of Gaddi's famous dishes.

The wine cellar is among the best and largest in Hong Kong, with a collection of rare vintages.

In a 2006 Independent feature on romantic dining, author Alexandra Antonioni wrote: "They don't make restaurants like this any more and everyone should dine at Gaddi's at least once in their lifetime. Nothing can touch it for glamour and sheer indulgence."

Recognitions
One Michelin star, <<Michelin Guide Hong Kong Macau 2021>>

2020 Forbes Travel Guide Five-Star restaurant

Pinor – China's Wine List of The Year Awards 2018

Wine Spectator 2020 – Best of Award of Excellence

Wine Luxe Magazine: Wine by The Glass Restaurant Awards Gold Medal 2020

Wine Luxe Magazine - Top 10 Wine Pairing Restaurant Awards 2020

References

French restaurants in Hong Kong
Restaurants established in 1953
1953 establishments in Hong Kong